Badra District is a district of the Wasit Governorate, Iraq. Its seat is the city of Badra.

References

Districts of Wasit Governorate